Labrador is a 1988 novel by Kathryn Davis. It is Davis's debut novel.

Major themes 
The novel deals with sibling rivalry, parental love, adult irrationality, and is a coming-of-age story about two young girls struggling with the powerful changes in their bodies and minds.

Publication history 
It was originally published in 1988 by Farrar, Straus, and Giroux. The novel went out of print before being reissued by Graywolf Press on March 5, 2019.

Literary significance and reception 
John Crowley, reviewing the novel in 1988, wrote, "Kathryn Davis has taken the sad and binding stuff of many a first novel - the inescapable family, the growth into knowledge, the heavy burden of physical life and the queasy processes of becoming - and fashioned genuinely new embodiments for it."

Michiko Kakutani, also reviewing the novel for The New York Times, wrote, "Ms. Davis demonstrates a formidable talent for capturing the savage confusions of youth. She is able to map out the fuzzy frontiers that exist in a child's mind between reality and fantasy and in doing so also to convey the perils of childhood and adolescence -both the real and the imagined."

References 

1988 American novels
Realist novels
English-language novels
Farrar, Straus and Giroux books
1988 debut novels
Graywolf Press books